A dastār (from ; dast or "hand" with the agentive suffix -ār; also known as a ਪੱਗ paga or ਪੱਗੜੀ pagaṛī in Punjabi) is an item of headwear associated with Sikhism, and is an important part of Sikh culture. The word is loaned from Persian through Punjabi. In Persian, the word dastār can refer to any kind of turban and replaced the original word for turban, dolband (دلبند), from which the English word is derived.

Among the Sikhs, the dastār is an article of faith that represents equality, honour, self-respect, courage, spirituality, and piety. The Khalsa Sikh men and women, who keep the Five Ks, wear the turban to cover their long, uncut hair (kesh). The Sikhs regard the dastār as an important part of the unique Sikh identity. After the ninth Sikh Guru, Tegh Bahadur, was sentenced to death by the Mughal emperor Aurangzeb, Guru Gobind Singh, the tenth Sikh Guru created the Khalsa and gave five articles of faith, one of which is unshorn hair, which the dastār covers.

History 

The dastār has been an important part of the Sikh religion since the time of the First Guru, Guru Nanak who honoured Guru Angad Dev who honoured Guru Amar Das with a special dastār when he was declared the next Guru. When Guru Ram Das died, Guru Arjan was honoured with the dastār of Guruship.

 Marne di pag Pirthiye badhi. Guriyaee pag Arjan Ladhi

Guru Gobind Singh, the last human Sikh Guru, wrote:

Kangha dono vaqt kar, paag chune kar bandhai. ("Comb your hair twice a day and tie your turban carefully, turn by turn.")

Bhai Rattan Singh Bhangu, one of the earliest Sikh historians, wrote in Sri Gur Panth Parkash:
 Doi vele utth bandhyo dastare, pahar aatth rakhyo shastar sambhare

 Kesan ki kijo pritpal, nah(i) ustran se katyo vaal

 Tie your dastār twice a day and wear shaster (weapons to protect dharma), and keep them with care, 24 hours a day.

 Take good care of your hair. Do not cut your hair by blade.

Significance 

In the Khalsa society, the turban signifies many virtues:

 Equality
The Sikh society is an egalitarian one, and free of gender, religion, race, nationality or sexual orientation. The institution of Khalsa was based on "Aape Gur Chela", no master no slave.

 Spirituality
The dastār is a symbol of spirituality, holiness, and humility in Sikhism.

 Honour and self-respect
 The dastār is also a symbol of honour and self-respect. In the Punjabi culture, those who have selflessly served the community are traditionally honoured with turbans.

 Piety and moral values
 The dastār also signifies piety and purity of mind. In the Punjabi society, the Khalsa Sikhs are considered as protectors of the weak, even among the non-Sikhs. In the older times, the Khalsa warriors moved from village to village at night, during the battles. When they needed a place to hide from the enemy, the womenfolk, who had a very high degree of trust in them used to let them inside their houses. It was a common saying in Punjab: Aye nihang, booha khol de nishang ("The nihangs are at the door. Dear woman! go ahead open the door without any fear whatsoever.")

 Courage
 Sikhs wear a dastār, to cover their long hair, which is never cut, as per the command of their previous Guru, Guru Gobind Singh. There are many references in the Sikh history that describe how Guru Gobind Singh personally tied dumalas (dastār) on the heads of both his elder sons Ajit Singh and Jujhar Singh, and how he personally gave them arms, decorated them like bridegrooms, and sent them to the battlefield at Chamkaur Sahib where they both died as martyrs. A blue-colored turban is especially identified with courage, sacrifice and martyrdom.

 Friendship and relationship
Pag Vatauni ("exchange of turban") is a Punjabi custom, in which the men exchange dastārs with their closest friends. Once they exchange turbans they become friends for life and forge a permanent relationship. They take a solemn pledge to share their joys and sorrows under all circumstances. Exchanging turban is a glue that can bind two individuals or families together for generations.

 Sayings
There are many Punjabi idioms and proverbs that describe how important is a dastār in one's life. Bhai Gurdas writes:
Tthande khuhu naike pag visar(i) aya sir(i) nangai
Ghar vich ranna(n) kamlia(n) dhussi liti dekh(i) kudhange

 ("A man, after taking a bath at the well during winter time, forgot his dastār at the well and came home bareheaded.
 When the women saw him at home without a dastār, they thought someone had died and they started to cry.")

Uniform of Sikhism 

The dastār is considered an integral part of the unique Sikh identity. The bare head is not considered appropriate as per gurbani. If a Sikh wants to become one with his/her guru, he/she must look like a guru (wear a dastār). Guru Gobind Singh stated:
 Khalsa mero roop hai khaas. Khalse me hau karo niwas.
 ("Khalsa is a true picture of mine. I live in Khalsa.")

Maintaining long hair and tying the dastār is seen as a token of love, obedience of the wishes of Sikh gurus, and acceptance to the Will of God. A quote from Sikhnet:

Styles of dastārs

Nok Pagg 
This is a very common Sikh Turban style and is most common in the Indian state of Punjab, India. The Nok is a double wide Dastar. Six meters of the dastar cloth are cut in half then in two or three meter pieces. They are sewn together to make it double wide, thus creating a "double patti" or a nok dastar. This dastar is larger than most Sikh dastars but contains fewer wraps around the head.

Chand Tora Dumalla 

The Chand Tora Dumalla is the style of turban generally worn by Nihang Sikhs. This is a warrior style turban meant for going into battle. The "Chand Tora" is a metal symbol consisting of a crescent and a double edged sword, it is held in place at the front of the turban by a woven chainmail cord tied in a pattern within the turban to protect the head from slashing weapons. This was not the original battle turban for the Khalsa as the Dastar Bunga was the first.

Amritsari Dumalla 
This is the most common Dumalla Dastar. Unlike the Taksali Dumalla this one slants backwards and Amritdharis keep Kirpans in the pouches on the sides. It consists of-

 One five meter piece (mostly Navy or electric blue)
 one 11 meter piece any color, commonly sabz (white) and pavo blue. Both pieces are 35 cm wide, and referred to in Amritsar as Dhamala Material

Shia Afghani Turban 
Turbans are part of the national dress in Afghanistan. They are used more widely than elsewhere in the Muslim world, and are worn in a wide range of styles and colours. In the country's south-east, turbans are wrapped loosely and largely, whereas in Kabul the garment tends to be smaller and tighter. In traditional Afghan society, a related piece of extra cloth called a patu serves practical purposes, such as for wrapping oneself against the cold, to sit on, to tie up an animal or to carry water in the cap. Different ethnic groups in Afghanistan wear different lungees with different patterns, way of styling it, fabric, stripes, lengths and colouration. Males of all ethnic backgrounds generally avoid wearing bright-coloured turbans that draw attention to oneself and prefer wearing simple colors that are white, off white, gray, dark blue and black.

Taksali Dumala 
This is a very simple and basic Dumala Sikh dastar. This is the most popular among the Akhand Kirtan Jatha and the Damdami Taksal.

Mughali Pagg 

This turban stemmed from Rajput tradition, and was adopted by the Mughals starting with Akbar (who was the first Mughal emperor to shift away from his Turkic roots and embrace Indic custom and culture) and would be continued among further Mughals. The Gurus from Guru Hargobind used this and it is only worn by extremely cultural and traditional Sikhs.

Darbara Singh Dumala 
The Darbara Singh Dumala, named after the second Jathedar of the Budha Dal, was the turban worn by some Nihang warriors. It is much larger than other turbans and is used to keep many weapons. The turban has two loose cloths from the turban.

Barnala Shahi Pagg 
Another common Sikh dastār style for men. Unlike the "double patti" dastār, the dastār is longer and goes ten or more times around the head. If you use the "Notai" technique and have a big joora (hair knot), do not make it right in front at your forehead. You will end up tying the dastār on the joora, and it will make your dastār look very high and big. According to modern Punjabi style the last (larh) of dastār is given a "V" shape by using the dastār pin. Sikhs also use a specially designed dastār needle (Punjabi: Salai,ਸਲਾਈ OR Baaj,ਬਾਜ) to tuck their hair inside from dastār and patka and also to maintain dastār cleanliness. The Barnala Shahi is common around the city of Barnala and the Base of the turban is smaller than the top.

Wattan Wali Pagg 
The Wattan-Wali Pagg is a size bigger than the other turban and is worn by Sikhs who are avid learners and Sikhs who are proud of their heritage and culture. It is divided in the middle due to the amount of wraps it rounds at the top.

Patiala Shahi Pagg 
Nowadays this type of dastār is widely famous in the newer generation. This type of dastār was first tied by Patiala King Bhupinder Singh. From his name the name of this type is originated 'Patiala Shahi'.

Dastar Bunga 
Dastar bunga, or turban fortress in Persian, is a style of turban used by a specific sect within the Sikhs, the Akali Nihangs (egoless immortals). As an essential part of their faith the warriors used the turban as a store for their expansive range of weapons.

This was the original Turban of the Khalsa Fauj of the Gurus. The Gurus wore this style during battle and the Mughal style while in peace. The Dastar Bunga is common in the Nihang traditions. The dark blue tunic (chola) and turban (dumalla) surmounted with quoit and dagger were first worn in 1699 at the time of the first Khalsa initiation ceremony of the double-edged sword (khanda-pahul). Next came the turban-flag (farra or farla), which was introduced by Guru Gobind Singh in 1702 during a clash with a Rajput hill king in the vicinity of Anandpur. The Khalsa's battle standard was cut down when its bearer, Akali Man Singh Nihang, fell wounded. Henceforth, the Guru decided that the dark blue flag should be worn as a part of Man Singh's turban, fluttering from its peak should be a yellow loose cloth for as long as its bearer had life in him. It is said that the full magnificence of the Akal-Nihang uniform emerged the following year.

Gurmukh Dastar 
Gurmukhi Dastar is worn by Amritdhari Sikhs. This is worn by the current Akal Takht Jathedar and is worn by 'Gurmukhs' or 'Gianis'.

Puratan Nok Pagg 
The later British Sikh soldiers also wore the Pharla which looks like a loose cloth extending from a Nok Pagg. It also sometimes had a Shamla or loose cloth running down the back and a turla or loose cloth going from the side.

Amritsari Shahi Pagg 
The Amritsari Shahi Pagg is similar to the Barnala Shahi Pagg except it is neater and is much sturdier. The top flap of the Turban is rotated straight and holds the turban together.

Kenyan or UK style turban 
This is a common dastār among young men in the Sikh Diaspora. It originated in Kenya, hence its name, among the Sikhs there. In the 1970s many Kenyan Sikhs migrated to the UK, making it popular there. Its design is very smart and elegant. Famous people like Jus Reign, Raj Grewal, singer Jassi Sidhu wear different variations of this style.
 
In May 2009, The Times of India reported that British researchers were trying to make a "bulletproof turban" that would allow the Sikhs in the British police to serve in firearms units.

Harassment faced by turban-wearing Sikhs

After the September 11, 2001, attacks in USA, a number of dastār-wearing Sikhs faced assaults by some Americans who confused them with Muslims, who were being associated with terrorism. Due to Sikh turbans resembling turban that Osama Bin Laden wore in his most iconic photo, United States Department of Justice worked with the Sikh American Legal Defense and Education Fund (SALDEF) to issue a poster aimed at getting Americans acquainted with Sikh turbans.

Conflicts with civil law

In modern times, there have been conflicts between Sikhs – especially those outside India – and laws which conflict with always wearing a dastār.
Sikh soldiers refused to wear helmets during World War I and World War II. Many Sikhs have refused to remove the dastār even in jails. Sikh scholar and social activist Bhai Randhir Singh underwent a fast to be able to wear a dastār in prison.

In the UK in 1982, the headmaster of a private school refused to admit an orthodox Sikh as a pupil unless he removed the dastār and cut his hair. This led to the long legal battle, Mandla v. Dowell Lee, a case which contributed to the creation of the legal term "ethno-religious".

In Canada in 1990, the Supreme Court of Canada ruled that Baltej Singh Dhillon, a Royal Canadian Mounted Police officer, should be allowed to wear a dastār while on duty. See the case of Grant v. Canada A.G (1995) 125 D.L.R. (4th) 556 (F.C.A.) aff'd (1994) 81 F.T.R. 195 (F.C.T.D.) (Reed J.) where the court said that the Sikh RCMP officer had a constitutional right to wear his dastār and that the government's decision to accommodate him was required to protect freedom of religion:

"The defendants and the intervenors, particularly the able argument of Ms. Chotalia for the Alberta Civil Liberties Association, turn the plaintiffs' argument respecting discrimination on its head.  They argue that the Commissioner's decision was designed to prevent discrimination occurring to Khalsa Sikhs.  As such they argue that that decision offends none of the provisions of the Charter, indeed that it is required by section 15 of the Charter." para 103	
Shirish Chotalia, Alberta lawyer, represented the Sikh Society of Calgary, the Alberta Civil Liberties Association, and the Friends of the Sikhs, pro bono.

In the United States in 2002, Jasjit Singh Jaggi, a Sikh traffic policeman employed with the New York Police Department, was forced to leave his job because he insisted on wearing a dastār on duty. He petitioned with the New York Human Rights Commission, and in 2004 a US judge ruled that he should be reinstated.

In France in 2004, the Sikh community protested against the introduction of a law prohibiting the display of any religious symbols in state-run schools. The Shiromani Gurdwara Parbandhak Committee urged the French Government to review the bill, stating that the ban would have grave consequences for the Sikhs. The Government of India discussed the matter with the French officials, who stated that an exception for turbaned Sikh boys in French public schools was not possible.

In 2007, the Canadian government introduced new procedures for accommodation of Sikhs in regard to passport photos, driver licensing, and other legal licensing. This bill was also supported by the Sikh Council of Canada.

In April 2009, Capt. Kamaljit Singh Kalsi and 2nd Lt. Tejdeep Singh Rattan challenged a U.S. Army order that they remove their turbans and shave their beards. In March 2010, Rattan became the first Sikh to graduate Army Officer School at Fort Sam Houston since the exemption was eliminated in 1984; a waiver was granted for his religion. Kalsi will also attend basic training.

In Ireland, Ravinder Singh Oberoi applied to become a member of the voluntary police force Garda Reserve but was not permitted to wear a dastār. He unsuccessfully claimed discrimination on grounds of race and religion; the High Court ruled in 2013 on a preliminary issue that he could not claim under employment equality legislation as he was not an employee and was not in vocational training.

Instances of acceptance

In 2012 British media reported that a Guardsman of the Scots Guards Jatinderpal Singh Bhullar became the first Sikh to guard Buckingham Palace wearing a dastār instead of the traditional bearskin.

Sikh members of the Canadian Armed Forces are permitted to wear the dastār on all orders of dress within the forces, although the unit commander retains the right to order for adjustments should a conflict arise with operational safety. The colour of the dastār for Sikh service members within the Canadian Army, and the Royal Canadian Air Force are required to match the colours of their unit's headgear. Sikhs serving within the Royal Canadian Navy are required to wear a white dastār when peaked caps are worn, and a black dastār when berets are worn. The unit's cap badge must also be worn on the dastār. Additionally, some units in the Canadian Armed Forces add a ribbon matching their regimental colours, worn crossed behind the cap badge and tucked in at the back.

Helmet exemption
In several parts of the world, Sikh riders are exempted from legal requirements to wear a helmet when riding a motorcycle or a bicycle, which cannot be done without removing the dastār. These places include India, Nepal and the Canadian provinces of Alberta, British Columbia, Ontario and Manitoba. Other places include Malaysia, Hong Kong, Singapore, Thailand, and the United Kingdom. In Queensland, Australia, riders of bicycles and mobility scooters are exempt from wearing an approved helmet, but not motorcyclists.
 
In 2008, Baljinder Badesha, a Sikh man living in Brampton, Ontario, Canada, lost a court case in which he challenged a $110 ticket received for wearing a dastār instead of a helmet while riding his motorcycle.

In September 2016 a court in Quebec, Canada, ruled that Sikh truck drivers working at the Port of Montreal must wear hard hats when required for safety reasons, effectively requiring them to remove their dastār. The judge stated that their safety outweighed their religious freedom. Previously Sikh drivers were able to avoid wearing hard hats if they remained within their vehicle, but this increased the loading times and was not commercially acceptable.

See also 
 Kesh (Sikhism)
 Dastar bunga
 Turban training centre
 Salai (needle)
 Sikh chola

References

External links
 

Indian headgear
Religious headgear
Sikh religious clothing
Turbans